The Batavi were an ancient Germanic tribe that lived around the modern Dutch Rhine delta in the area that the Romans called Batavia, from the second half of the first century BC to the third century AD. The name is also applied to several military units employed by the Romans that were originally raised among the Batavi. The tribal name, probably a derivation from batawjō ("good island", from Germanic bat- "good, excellent," which is also in the English "better," and awjō "island, land near water"), refers to the region's fertility, today known as the fruitbasket of the Netherlands (the Betuwe).

Finds of wooden tablets show that at least some were literate .

Location

The Batavi themselves are not mentioned by Julius Caesar in his commentary Commentarii de Bello Gallico, although he is often thought to have founded his dynasty's Germanic bodyguard, which was at least in later generations dominated by Batavi. But he did mention the "Batavian island" in the Rhine river. The island's easternmost point is at a split in the Rhine, one arm being the Waal the other the Lower Rhine/Old Rhine (hence the Latin name Insula Batavorum, "Island of the Batavi"). Much later Tacitus wrote that they had originally been a tribe of the Chatti, a tribe in Germany also never mentioned by Caesar (unless they were his "Suebi"), who were forced by internal dissension to move to their new home. The time when this happened is unknown, but Caesar does describe forced movements of tribes from the east in his time, such as the Usipetes and Tencteri.

Tacitus also reports that before their arrival the area had been "an uninhabited district on the extremity of the coast of Gaul, and also of a neighbouring island, surrounded by the ocean in front, and by the river Rhine in the rear and on either side". This view, however, is contradicted by the archeological evidence, which shows continuous habitation from at least the third century BC onward. 
 
The strategic position, to wit the high bank of the Waal offering an unimpeded view far into Germania Transrhenana (Germania Beyond the Rhine), was recognized first by Drusus, who built a massive fortress (castra) and a headquarters (praetorium) in imperial style. The latter was in use until the Batavian revolt.

Archeological evidence suggests they lived in small villages, composed of six to 12 houses in the very fertile lands between the rivers, and lived by agriculture and cattle-raising. Finds of horse skeletons in graves suggest a strong equestrian preoccupation. On the south bank of the Waal (in what is now Nijmegen) a Roman administrative center was built, called Oppidum Batavorum. An Oppidum was a fortified warehouse, where a tribe's treasures were stored and guarded. This centre was razed during the Batavian Revolt. The Smetius Collection was instrumental in settling the debate about the exact location of the Batavians.

Military units

The first Batavi commander we know of is named Chariovalda, who led a charge across the Vīsurgis (Weser) river against the Cherusci led by Arminius during the campaigns of Germanicus in Germania Transrhenana.

Tacitus (De origine et situ Germanorum XXIX) described the Batavi as the bravest of the tribes of the area, hardened in the Germanic wars, with cohorts under their own commanders transferred to Britannia. They retained the honour of the ancient association with the Romans, not required to pay tribute or taxes and used by the Romans only for war: "They furnished to the Empire nothing but men and arms", Tacitus remarked. Well regarded for their skills in horsemanship and swimming—for men and horses could cross the Rhine without losing formation, according to Tacitus. Dio Cassius describes this surprise tactic employed by Aulus Plautius against the "barbarians"—the British Celts— at the battle of the River Medway, 43:

The barbarians thought that Romans would not be able to cross it without a bridge, and consequently bivouacked in rather careless fashion on the opposite bank; but he sent across a detachment of Germanic tribesmen, who were accustomed to swim easily in full armour across the most turbulent streams. [...] Thence the Britons retired to the river Thames at a point near where it empties into the ocean and at flood-tide forms a lake. This they easily crossed because they knew where the firm ground and the easy passages in this region were to be found; but the Romans in attempting to follow them were not so successful. However, the Germans swam across again and some others got over by a bridge a little way up-stream, after which they assailed the barbarians from several sides at once and cut down many of them. (Cassius Dio, Roman History, Book 60:20)
It is uncertain how they were able to accomplish this feat. The late fourth century writer on Roman military affairs Vegetius mentions soldiers using reed rafts, drawn by leather leads, to transport equipment across rivers. But the sources suggest the Batavi were able to swim across rivers actually wearing full armour and weapons. This would only have been possible by the use of some kind of buoyancy device: Ammianus Marcellinus mentions that the Cornuti regiment swam across a river floating on their shields "as on a canoe" (357). Since the shields were wooden, they may have provided sufficient buoyancy

The Batavi were used to form the bulk of the Emperor's personal Germanic bodyguard from Augustus to Galba. They also provided a contingent for their indirect successors, the Emperor's horse guards, the Equites singulares Augusti.

A Batavian contingent was used in an amphibious assault on Ynys Mon (Anglesey), taking the assembled Druids by surprise, as they were only expecting Roman ships.

Numerous altars and tombstones of the cohorts of Batavi, dating to the second century and third century, have been found along Hadrian's Wall, notably at Castlecary and Carrawburgh. As well as in Germany, Yugoslavia, Hungary, Romania and Austria.

Revolt of the Batavi

Despite the alliance, one of the high-ranking Batavi, Julius Paullus, to give him his Roman name, was executed by Fonteius Capito on a false charge of rebellion. His kinsman Gaius Julius Civilis was paraded in chains in Rome before Nero; though he was acquitted by Galba, he was retained at Rome, and when he returned to his kin in the year of upheaval in the Roman Empire, 69, he headed a Batavian rebellion. He managed to capture Castra Vetera, the Romans' lost two legions, while two others (I Germanica and XVI Gallica) were controlled by the rebels. The rebellion became a real threat to the Empire when the conflict escalated to northern Gaul and Germania. The Roman army retaliated and invaded the insula Batavorum. A bridge was built over the river Nabalia, where the warring parties approached each other on both sides to negotiate peace. The narrative was told in great detail in Tacitus' History, book iv, although, unfortunately, the narrative breaks off abruptly at the climax. Following the uprising, Legio X Gemina was housed in a stone castra to keep an eye on the Batavians.

Fate of the Batavi
The Batavi were still mentioned in 355 during the reign of Constantius II (317 - 361), when their island was already dominated by the Salii, a Frankish tribe that had sought Roman protection there in 297 after having been expelled from their own country by the Saxons.

Constantius Gallus added inhabitants of Batavia to his legions, "of whose discipline we still make use." It has been assumed they merged with the Salii shortly before or after and, after having been expelled by another tribe (it has been proposed this was the Chamavi), shared their subsequent migration to Toxandria. In the Late Roman army there was a unit called Batavi.

The name of the Bavarian town of Passau descends from the Roman Batavis, which was named after the Batavi. The town's name is old as it shows the typical effects of the High German consonant shift (b > p, t > ss).

The Batavian revival

In the 16th-century emergence of a popular foundation story and origin myth for the Dutch people, the Batavians came to be regarded as their ancestors during their national struggle for independence during the Eighty Years' War. The mix of fancy and fact in the Cronyke van Hollandt, Zeelandt ende Vriesland (called the Divisiekroniek) by the Augustinian friar and humanist Cornelius Gerardi Aurelius, first published in 1517, brought the spare remarks in Tacitus' newly rediscovered Germania to a popular public; it was being reprinted as late as 1802. Contemporary Dutch virtues of independence, fortitude and industry were fully recognizable among the Batavians in more scholarly history represented in Hugo Grotius' Liber de Antiquitate Republicae Batavicorum (1610). The origin was perpetuated by Romeyn de Hooghe's Spiegel van Staat der Vereenigden Nederlanden ("Mirror of the State of the United Netherlands," 1706), which also ran to many editions, and it was revived in the atmosphere of Romantic nationalism in the late eighteenth-century reforms that saw a short-lived Batavian Republic and, in the colony of the Dutch East Indies, a capital that was named Batavia. Though since Indonesian independence the city is called Jakarta, its inhabitants up to the present still call themselves Betawi or Orang Betawi, i.e. "People of Batavia" - a name ultimately derived from the ancient Batavians.

The success of this tale of origins was mostly due to resemblance in anthropology, which was based on tribal knowledge. Being politically and geographically inclusive, this historical vision filled the needs of Dutch nation-building and integration in the 1890-1914 era.

However, a disadvantage of this historical nationalism soon became apparent. It suggested there were no strong external borders, while allowing for the fairly clear-cut internal borders that were emerging as the society polarized into three parts. After 1945, the tribal knowledge lost its grip on anthropology and mostly vanished. Modern variants of the Batavian founding myth are made more accurate by pointing out that the Batavians were one part of the ancestry of the Dutch people - together with the Frisians, Franks and Saxons - by tracing patterns of DNA. Echoes of this cultural continuity can still be found among various areas of Dutch modern culture, such as the very popular replica of the ship Batavia that can today be found in Lelystad.

See also
 Laeti
 List of Germanic peoples

Notes

Bibliography

Further reading

External links
Tacitus, Histories, Book iv
A map of the Roman province Germania Inferior and neighbouring tribes.
Cohors Primae Batavorum

 
Chatti
Early Germanic peoples
Netherlands in the Roman era
Prehistoric Netherlands
Rhine